Avenue is the primary main street in central Osaka, Japan. It runs north-south, passing Umeda, Nakanoshima, Shinsaibashi, Dōtonbori, Ame-mura, and Namba districts. Underneath the street is the Midōsuji Line subway. Especially in autumn when leaves of the ginkgo roadside trees turn yellow, a beautiful landscape can be seen.

Route description
Midōsuji becomes the Shinmido-suji in Kita-ku, Osaka, running concurrently with Japan National Route 423. To the south, Midōsuji becomes the Kishu Highway.

History
In Edo period, Midosuji was just a narrow street called "". Midōsuji was built in the Taishō period, widening an existing north-south street and extending it to run all the way to Umeda in the north and Namba in the south.

Today Midōsuji is an ultra high-class shopping street, housing clothing stores by such brands as Louis Vuitton, Chanel, major hotels, and even an Apple flagship.

The area has been referred to in songs by popular artists such as Hitomi Yaida on her 2006 album It's a New Day.

Features

References

Tourist attractions in Osaka
Shopping districts and streets in Japan
Roads in Osaka Prefecture